The Briton is a 1722 tragedy by the British writer Ambrose Philips. The play is set in pre-Roman Celtic Britain.

Performed at Drury Lane the original cast included Barton Booth as Vanoc, Robert Wilks as Ivor, John Thurmond as Didius, John Bowman as Ebranc, John Mills as Valens, Charles Williams as Alan, William Mills as Idwall, John Roberts as Messenger, Mary Porter as Cartismande and Hester Santlow as Gwendolen.

References

Bibliography
 Burling, William J. A Checklist of New Plays and Entertainments on the London Stage, 1700-1737. Fairleigh Dickinson Univ Press, 1992.

1722 plays
West End plays
Tragedy plays
Plays set in antiquity
Plays set in England
Plays by Ambrose Philips